Berg Party was a local political party in Berg, Sweden, formed by Olle Nord, previously a local leader of the Centre Party, prior to the 2002 elections. 

BP swept the 2002 municipal polls. It got 1,959 votes (41.3%) and 16 out of 39 seats. BP is currently leading the municipal government.

External links
 Blog with many articles related to BP

Swedish local political parties